Prince Popiel ІІ (or Duke Popiel) was a legendary 9th-century ruler of two proto-Polish tribes, the Goplans and West Polans. He was the last member of the Popielids, a mythical dynasty before the Piasts. According to the chroniclers Gallus Anonymus, Jan Długosz, and Marcin Kromer, as a consequence of his bad rule he was deposed, besieged by his subjects, and eaten alive by mice in a tower in Kruszwica.

As the legend goes, Prince Popiel was a cruel and corrupt ruler who cared only for wine, women, and song. He was greatly influenced by his wife, a beautiful but power-hungry German princess. Because of Popiel's misrule and his failure to defend the land from marauding Vikings, his twelve uncles conspired to depose him; however, at his wife's instigation, he had them all poisoned during a feast (some believe that she committed the act herself). Instead of cremating their bodies as was the custom, he had the corpses cast into Lake Gopło.

When the commoners saw what Popiel and his wife had done, they rebelled. The couple took refuge in a tower near the lake. As the story goes, a throng of mice and rats (which had been feeding on the unburnt bodies of Popiel's uncles) rushed into the tower, chewed through the walls, and devoured Popiel and his wife alive. Prince Popiel was succeeded by Piast Kołodziej and Siemowit.

On the shore of Lake Gopło stands a medieval tower, nicknamed the Mouse Tower; however, it bears no relation to the site of the events described in the legend as it was erected some 500 years thereafter.

See also 
 Mouse Tower – a similar legend about the cruelty and demise of Hatto II (Archbishop of Mainz).
 An Ancient Tale – novel by Polish writer Józef Kraszewski

References

External links
The Pomeranian and Kujawy Province
The Old Tale: When the Sun Was God (Polish film about Prince Popiel.)
Popiel (Website summarizing information from medieval chronicles.)

Legendary Polish monarchs
9th-century Slavs
Deaths due to animal attacks
Rodent attacks
Slavic warriors